Chaugain is a village and corresponding community development block in Buxar district of Bihar, India.

As of 2011, the population of Chaugain was 12,611, in 2,124 households, while the total population of Chaugain block was 48,743, in 7,929 households.

Notable people

Amrendra Pratap Singh
Basant Singh (ex MLA Dumraon and Minister in Rabri Devi govt)
Mrigendra Pratap Singh

Demographics 

Chaugain is a rural block, with no large urban centres. The sex ratio of the block was 948 as of 2011, with a ratio of 939 in the 0-6 age bracket at the time. Members of scheduled castes made up 16.02% of the block population, and members of scheduled tribes made up 0.61%. The literacy rate of Chaugain block was 69.43%, including 80.89% among men and 57.27% among women.

Most workers in Chaugain worked in agriculture in 2011, with 29.69% being cultivators who owned or leased their own land and a further 55.02% being agricultural labourers who worked someone else's land for wages. 2.29% were household industry workers, and the remaining 13.01% were other workers.

Villages 
There are 23 villages in Chaugain block, 20 of which are inhabited and 3 of which are uninhabited.

References 

Villages in Buxar district